Fat Chance Belly Dance or FCBD (formerly known as American Tribal Style or ATS) is a modern style of belly dance created by Fat Chance Belly Dance director, Carolena Nericcio-Bohlman. The primary defining characteristic of FCBD style is group improvisation. It is generally performed in a group, often at community events such as festivals and parades, with dancers typically favoring a look provided by wide-legged pants gathered at the ankles (also known as pantaloons), tops known as cholis and full skirts.

Tribal style 

The roots of tribal bellydance are accredited to Jamila Salimpour,. She fostered a fusion of costumes and folkloric dances styles from the Middle East, North African, Spain, and India (such as the Banjara of Rajasthan). Salimpour teaches and performs along the West Coast of North America. Using traditional folkloric dance elements and costumes inspired by traditional and ethnographic traditions, she presented on stage through Bal Anat, a colorful company of musicians, singers, and dancers to create a "souk" or "almost-circus" feel. Adapting from native dancers from Morocco, Algeria, Turkey, Egypt, Syria, and Lebanon dancers in the United States, she catalogued "belly dance movement", creating the foundation for Tribal Style and American Tribal Style repertoire. Jamila's Bal Anat "paved the way for others to use a fusion of dances of the Middle East and North Africa as inspiration for their version of belly-dancing."

In the 1970s, a former student of Salimpour, Masha Archer, taught and directed a troupe known as San Francisco Classic Dance Company. Archer blended the diverse elements of Bal Anat into a single cohesive dance style she styled as "belly-dance" as some of the earliest fusion belly-dance in the Americas.

Archer's student Carolena Nerriccio is credited with the dance style bearing the name "tribal belly-dance". She registered American Tribal Style Belly-dance, and for decades, Carolena grew her format, then brought her adaptations to mainstream through videos, compilations, performances, and workshops. Dancers inspired by Carolena's work with ATS created offshoots of the style, some re-taining stylistic elements of ATS while others evolved far from the original.

2021, Tribal Style represents everything from folkloric-inspired dances (such as Bal Anat) to a fusion of ancient dance techniques from India, the Middle East, Spain, and Africa. Tribal Style covers many flavors of American Belly-Dance, folklorically inspired and fusion and cross-over styles, each exploring modern, jazz, dance theatre, and slum with belly-dance, as well as fusion with traditional classical ethnic dance forms such as Bhangra, Bharata Natyam, Flamenco, Polynesian, and West African Dance.

"Tribal is not the name for experimental. It actually defines this style." - Carolena Nericco, founder of FatChanceBellyDanceStyle (formerly ATS) in the podcast interview with Alicia Free

Improvisational choreography
American tribal-style belly dance's movements are inspired by folkloric dances of the Middle East, North Africa, Spain, and India. ATS is a method of improvisational choreography, using a physical vocabulary of movements and cues allowing the dancers to improvise while dancing. This dance vocabulary allows ATS dancers from different regions to collaborate from their first meeting.

American Tribal Style belly-dancers use finger cymbals or zils, focusing on the group instead of solo performance. There are two families of movements: slow movements and fast movements. Zils are worn but usually not played while performing "slow movements". However, for example, if the featured duet trio or quartet are dancing to a Moroccan 6 rhythm, members of the chorus may accompany them through playing their zils. During "fast movements", the zils are played. One common rhythm played on the dancer's zils is the right-left-right pattern. Certain "fast" movements require the dancers and chorus to play the military zil pattern. Infrequently-played patterns include the Moroccan 6; some troupes experiment with 9/8 Turkish rhythm.

ATS features call-and-answer interspersed with solos. Often, a chorus provides a moving back-drop while the featured duet, trio, or quartet is one focus. Dancers take turns coming out of the chorus in duets, trios, and quartets because if, for example, five dancers were to come out into formation, the view of the leader is less effective. Groups of five or more are generally used toward specific formations to improve this site-line.

The principal dancers and the chorus function improvisationally. Formations for the principal dancers and the chorus are formalized in the ATS format to maximize dancer visibility to spectators while maximizing group visibility of the leader. In most traditional ATS formations, the leader is left with followers behind and to the right. Dancers angle their bodies to the left to be able to read the leader's cues. Similar rules apply for members of the chorus; their leader is left. While dancers face each other in a circle, the lead is "neutral"; the next movement can be initiated by any dancer in the circle. Thus, maintaining eye contact is important each time dancers are in a circle.

The cues and formations are the foundation of group improvisational dance. They allow the dancers to move together without choreography. Other troupes create formal choreography while using the ATS-specific formations and cues.

Costumes 
ATS is characterized by costumes appropriated from "folkloric" traditions and cultures. They often comprise skirts over pantaloons; a short choli top to emphasize the naked midriff under a brassiere decorated with coins and textiles; a decorative headband, turban, and/or hair flowers and other decorations; hip scarves with yarn, tassels, or fringe; a decorative belt, often with tassels, coins, and/or medallions; and oxidized silver jewelry. The jewelry commonly originates from Central Asia, from any number of nomadic tribes or empires (e.g., Kuchi, Turkoman, Rajasthan), and is often large and set with semi-precious stones or, mass-produced, glass. Makeup usually focuses on a dark eye and red lip, and a 'bindi' can be used if appropriate. Some dancers "tattoo" their faces with kohl or kajal.[8] Some dancers perform barefoot, others perform in shoes or sandals.

I speak for my troupe in terms of the evolution of costuming style. My teacher, Masha, encouraged us to wear a choli and pantaloons, a fringe shawl, lots of big, chunky jewelry, and a headdress or some sort of embellished hair worn 'up'. Our coin bras were optional. Early versions of FCBD used that format, then dancers evolved into other pieces such as skirts and tassel belts. We eventually standardized our look to be choli, bra, pantaloons, skirt, shawl and/or tassel belt, headdress, and lots of jewelry.
"American Tribal Style Make-Up And Costuming," an interview with Carolena Nericcio by Sheri Waldrop

References 

  Kajira Djoumahna (2003). The Tribal Bible, Exploring The Phenomenon That Is American Tribal Style Bellydance. Santa Rosa, CA: BlackSheep BellyDance. .
  Tazz Richards (2000). The Belly Dance Book : Rediscovering the Oldest Dance. Concord, CA: Backbeat Press. .

Belly dance

pl:American Tribal Style